"María" is a song written by Marcelo Molina, Gustavo Márquez and Teddy Jauren and performed by Cuban singer Franco. It was released in 1988 as a single from Franco's album Definitivo (1988) and became his second number-one single in the Billboard Top Latin Songs chart, after "Toda La Vida" in 1986. It ended 1988 as the fourth best-performing single of the year.

References

1988 singles
1988 songs
Franco (singer) songs
Spanish-language songs